State Route 197 (SR 197) is a primary state highway in the U.S. state of Virginia. The state highway runs  from SR 147 in Richmond east to U.S. Route 1 (US 1) and US 301 in Richmond.

Route description

SR 197 begins at an intersection with SR 147 (Cary Street) in the Windsor Farms neighborhood of Richmond. The state highway heads northeast on Malvern Avenue, a four-lane undivided street that passes through a residential area and intersects SR 6 (Patterson Avenue) and Monument Avenue. North of Broad Street, which carries US 33 and US 250, SR 197 enters an industrial area and leaves the city of Richmond. The state highway follows Westwood Avenue through Henrico County. SR 197 expands to a divided highway as it passes under Interstate 195 (I-195, Beltline Expressway) with no access, then crosses over CSX's RF&P Subdivision. North of the railroad tracks, Westwood Avenue splits to the east at a partial trumpet interchange; there is no direct access from westbound Westwood Avenue to eastbound SR 197 or from westbound SR 197 to eastbound Westwood Avenue. SR 197 continues as Saunders Avenue, which re-enters the city of Richmond just north of the Westwood Avenue interchange and has a short split section just south of its junction with Laburnum Avenue.

SR 197 continues east along four-lane divided Laburnum Avenue, which also heads west as an unnumbered street a short distance to a partial diamond interchange with I-195 just south of its junction with I-64 and I-95 (Richmond–Petersburg Turnpike). SR 197 passes under the two Interstates just south of their divergence point and passes an entrance to westbound I-64. The state highway continues east through a residential area where it intersects SR 161 (Hermitage Road); in the center of the intersection is a statue of Confederate General A.P. Hill. After intersecting Brook Road, SR 197 reaches its eastern terminus at US 1 and US 301 (Chamberlayne Avenue) in the Ginter Park neighborhood. Laburnum Avenue continues as a partial circumferential highway of Richmond through Henrico County that provides access to Richmond Raceway and East Highland Park and eventually ends at the junction of SR 5 and SR 895.

Major intersections

References

External links

Virginia Highways Project: VA 197

197
State Route 197
State Route 197